Showmanship may refer to:
Showmanship (performing), the skill of performing in such a manner that will appeal to an audience or aid in conveying the performance's essential theme or message
Dog showmanship, a set of skills and etiquette used by handlers of dogs in a dog competition
Horse showmanship, an event found at many horse shows
Guitar showmanship, gimmicks, jumps, or other stunts with a guitar

See also
Showman, having a variety of meanings, usually by context and depending on the country